Polyamory for Dummies is a 2021 Spanish-French romantic comedy film directed by Fernando Colomo which stars Karra Elejalde, María Pedraza, Quim Àvila and Toni Acosta.

Plot 
The plot follows Manu, a YouTuber vowing to defend romantic love who falls romantically for Amanda, a woman committed to several polyamorous intimate relationships.

Cast

Production 
The screenplay was penned by Fernando Colomo, Casandra Macías-Gago and Marina Maesso. A joint Spanish-French coproduction by Morena Films alongside Acuerdo de Fluidos AIE and Ran Entertainment, it had the participation of Amazon Prime Video, RTVE and Telemadrid, funding from ICAA and support from the Madrid regional administration.

It was shot in 2020 in locations of Madrid and Extremadura (including Navalmoral de la Mata and the resort-island of Valdecañas).

Release 
The film screened at the 5th BCN Film Fest on 20 April 2021. Distributed by Vértice Cine, it was theatrically released in Spain on 21 May 2021.

Reception 
Raquel Hernández Luján of HobbyConsolas gave the film 55 out of 100 points, considering the film to be "irregular", even if it featured a couple of hilarious sketches, also assessing that "despite trying to be very open-minded, the film has the classic structure of romantic comedies and feels dated".

Yago García of Cinemanía scored 3 out of 5 stars, considering that "the film's development is predictable and not all of its jokes work", "but Colomo has made it a likeable work".

See also 
 List of Spanish films of 2021

References 

2021 films
2021 romantic comedy films
Spanish romantic comedy films
French romantic comedy films
Films shot in the province of Cáceres
Films shot in Madrid
2020s Spanish-language films
Morena Films films
2020s Spanish films
2020s French films
Films directed by Fernando Colomo